Kuttippuram railway station (Code: KTU) is a railway station in the Malappuram district, Kerala and falls under the Palakkad railway division of the Southern Railway zone, Indian Railways.

History
Tirur railway station, which is the one of the nearest stations to Kuttippuram is the oldest railway station in the Indian state of Kerala. The railway line from Tirur to Beypore is the oldest railway line in the state which also consists of other railway stations at Tanur, Parappanangadi, and Vallikkunnu. The Tirur–Beypore railway line started functioning on March 12, 1861. In the same year, a railway line from Tirur to Kuttippuram was laid via Tirunavaya and it started function on May 1, 1861. Kuttippuram railway station is one of the oldest railway stations in the state. Later in 1862, the railway line was expanded from Kuttippuram to Pattambi, and later it was again expanded from Pattambi to Podanur in the same year. Later the Chennai–Mangalore railway line was formed as an extension of the Beypore–Podanur line formed in the years 1861–1862.

See also
Kuttippuram
Kuttippuram bridge
Bharathappuzha

References

Palakkad railway division